Davit Lomaia (born 18 May 1985 in Tbilisi) is a Georgian footballer who plays for Zugdidi.

He is the brother of Giorgi Lomaia.

Lomaia capped for Georgia on 12 September 2007, a friendly match against Azerbaijan. He substituted Aleksandre Kvakhadze in 70 minutes.

External links

Footballers from Georgia (country)
Georgia (country) international footballers
Association football central defenders
1985 births
Living people
FC WIT Georgia players
FC Sioni Bolnisi players
FC Metalurgi Rustavi players
FC Spartaki Tskhinvali players
FC Sasco players
FC Zugdidi players